Sara de Jesus Freitas de Oliveira is an Olympic swimmer from Portugal. She has swum for Portugal at 2008 and 2012 Olympics, as well as at multiple World Championships (2003, 2007, 2011) and Short Course Worlds (2010, 2012).

At the 2012 Olympics she swam the Women's 100 and 200 Butterfly. At those games, she finished 36th overall in the heats in the 100 m butterfly and failed to reach the final.  In the 200 m butterfly, she finished in 24th place and also did not reach the final.

References

Portuguese female butterfly swimmers

Living people
Olympic swimmers of Portugal
Swimmers at the 2008 Summer Olympics
Swimmers at the 2012 Summer Olympics
Sportspeople from Porto
1985 births
21st-century Portuguese women